The 1945 West Virginia State Yellow Jackets football team was an American football team that represented West Virginia State University as a member of the Colored Intercollegiate Athletic Association (CIAA) during the 1945 college football season. In their first season under head coach Mark Cardwell, the team compiled a 5–1–2 record and outscored opponents by a total of 142 to 32.

The team played its home games in Charleston, West Virginia, and at Lakin Field in Institute, West Virginia.

Schedule

References

West Virginia State
West Virginia State Yellow Jackets football seasons
West Virginia State Yellow Jackets football